San Andrés Municipality may refer to:
 San Andrés Municipality, Beni
 San Andrés, Antioquia, Colombia
 San Andrés, Lempira, Honduras

Municipality name disambiguation pages